Le Théâtre was a French cultural magazine created in 1898 as a monthly, then fortnightly until July 1914.

History 
Le Théâtre was a periodical launched by Goupil & Cie, which also published Les Arts and La Mode. Like L'Illustration, Le Théâtre was abundantly illustrated with high quality black and white photos. In 1900, the magazine often featured full-page color photographs, especially on the front cover. Le Théatre's editorial office was located on 24 Boulevard des Capucines in the 9th arrondissement of Paris. Its founder and director was the Franco-Napolitan photoengraver Michel Manzi (1849–1915), who was also the director of the Ateliers d'Asnières where the newspaper was printed by the successors and buyers of the Goupil house.

References 

1898 establishments
Magazines published in France
Theatre magazines